The non-marine molluscs of Cuba are a part of the molluscan wildlife of Cuba. Numerous species of non-marine molluscs are found in the wild in Cuba, which is in fact one of the richest places for the malacological fauna in the world, especially in land snails, hosting a high degree of endemism. Cuba has some highly charismatic species of land snails, such as those of the genus Polymita and Liguus.

A total of 42 species of freshwater molluscs occur in Cuba. Introduced species such as Tarebia granifera and Melanoides tuberculata are spread throughout the country and might be a threat for endemics and other native snails.

History 
There are many works regarding taxonomic and systematic studies in marine and land molluscs with a fewer number on ecology and distribution. Freshwater molluscs, however, are scarcer and have received less attention.

Freshwater molluscs overview 
A total of 10 (23.8%) out of 42 described freshwater snails and mussels are endemic in Cuba. The percentage of endemism shown in Cuban freshwater molluscs (23.8%) is characteristic of the fauna of islands. Only one endemic species exhibits a wide distribution range throughout the country while the others have small populations in a few or only one locality. Of the 42 freshwater molluscs of Cuba, 24 species occur within the limits of protected areas. Of these, Tarebia granifera and Physa acuta seem to be the most common snails while the endemics of the genus Hemisinus, Nephronaias, and Viviparus are quite rare in the protected areas, and have scarce populations in Cuba. Of the 253 protected areas in Cuba, only 35 have populations of freshwater molluscs (endemic and non-endemic species). A remarkable point is that 54% of protected areas host introduced species.

Five species of introduced freshwater molluscs occur in Cuba. The main species are the thiarids Tarebia granifera and Melanoides tuberculata (family Thiaridae). Other species are Pomacea diffusa and Marisa cornuarietis (family Ampullariidae), and Corbicula fluminea (family Corbiculidae).

The most of the freshwater mollusc endemic species in Cuba might be endangered or vulnerable. Shrinkage in distribution range of populations, introduction of exotic species, and habitat loss due to human activity are probably the main drivers of population declines. The continuous growth of the Cuban population has forced many populations of endemic molluscs to withdraw from many localities. This has been the result of, first, the construction of buildings near these species populations, which generate an associated pollution of the freshwater environment, and, second, a direct transformation to the ecosystems where the molluscs occur due to water consumption. The Cauto River, the largest river in Cuba, is an example of this transformation with the rerouting of some segments to build dams in order to provide water for the nearby cities. Many recreational infrastructures for tourism have been built in Cuba in the vicinity of areas where endemic freshwater molluscs are found. This is a common problem in places like Viñales, Soroa, Zapata Swamp, and Baracoa, which are among the most important tourist destinations in Cuba.

Freshwater gastropods 

Ampullariidae
 Pomacea diffusa Blume, 1957 – introduced, only scarce populations in the western region
 Pomacea poeyana (Pilsbry, 1927) – endemic, well distributed in Cuba
 Marisa cornuarietis (Linnaeus, 1758) – introduced, only scarce populations in the western region

Viviparidae
 Viviparus bermondianus (d'Orbigny, 1842) – endemic in the Zapata Peninsula, it has not been currently found and has perhaps disappeared

Pachychilidae
 Pachychilus nigratus (Poey, 1858) – endemic to Villa Clara
 Pachychilus violaceus (Preston, 1911) – endemic to the area from Santiago de Cuba to Baracoa

Thiaridae
 Hemisinus brevis (d'Orbigny, 1841) – endemic to Pinar del Río, scarce distribution
 Hemisinus cubanianus (d'Orbigny, 1841) – endemic to Pinar del Río, scarce distribution
 Melanoides tuberculata (O. F. Müller, 1774) – introduced and widespread
 Tarebia granifera (Lamarck, 1822) – introduced and widespread. Also with Physella acuta it is the most common freshwater snail in Cuba

Hydrobiidae
 Nanivitrea alcaldei (Jaume & Abbot, 1947) – endemic to Cárdenas, Cuba with one population, this small snail of less than 3 mm have not been currently found and have perhaps disappeared
 Nanivitrea helicoides (Gundlach, 1865) – endemic to Trinidad, Cuba with one population, this small snail of less than 3 mm have not been currently found and have perhaps disappeared

Lymnaeidae
 Galba cubensis (Pfeiffer, 1839) – synonym: Fossaria cubensis

Physidae
 Physella acuta (Draparnaud, 1805) – also with Tarebia granifera it is the most common freshwater snail in Cuba

Planorbidae
 Biomphalaria havanensis (L. Pfeiffer, 1839)
 Planorbella duryi (Wetherby, 1879) – synonym: Helisoma duryi

freshwater snails or freshwater bivalve family ?
 B. helophila
 P. parvulus
 B. pallida
 D. lucidum
 D. anatinum
 E. cubensis
 G. radiata
 P. columella
 D. cimex
 G. parvus
 L. manroensis

Land gastropods 

There are about 1300 or 1387 species of land gastropods in Cuba.

Land snails have a large degree of endemism and represent almost 94% of the species.

There is enormous number of species in the family Urocoptidae in Cuba, over 580 species.

Helicinidae
 Alcadia bermudezi Aguayo & Jaume, 1957
 Alcadia camagueyana Aguayo & Jaume, 1957
 Alcadia concinna (Gundlach in Pfeiffer, 1857)
 Alcadia dissimulans (Poey, 1858)
 Alcadia euglypta Clench & Aguayo, 1950
 Alcadia gonostoma (Gundlach in Poey, 1858)
 Alcadia hispida (Pfeiffer, 1839)
 Alcadia incrustata (Gundlach in Pfeiffer, 1859)
 Alcadia minima (d’Orbigny, 1842)
 Alcadia neebiana (Pfeiffer, 1862)
 Alcadia nitida (Pfeiffer, 1839)
 Alcadia nuda (Arango in Pfeiffer, 1866)
 Alcadia rotunda (d’Orbigny, 1842)
 Alcadia spectrabilis (Pfeiffer, 1858)
 Alcadia velutina (Poey, 1858)
 Calidviana littoricola (Gundlach in Pfeiffer, 1860)
 Ceratodiscus minimus (Gundlach in Pfeiffer, 1859)
 Emoda bayamensis (Poey, 1854)
 Emoda bermudezi Aguayo & Jaume, 1954
 Emoda blanesi Clench & Aguayo in Aguayo, 1953
 Emoda briarea (Poey, 1851)
 Emoda caledoniensis Clench & Jacobson, 1971
 Emoda ciliata (Poey, 1852)
 Emoda clementis Clench & Aguayo, 1950
 Emoda emoda (Pfeiffer, 1865)
 Emoda mayarina (Poey, 1854)
 Emoda najazaensis Aguayo & Jaume, 1954
 Emoda pulcherrima (Lea, 1834)
 Emoda sagraiana (d’Orbigny, 1842)
 Emoda silacea (Morelet, 1849)
 Emoda submarginata (Gray, 1824)
 Glyptemoda torrei Henderson, 1909
 Helicina adspersa Pfeiffer, 1839 or Helicina aspersa
 Helicina declivis Gundlach in Pfeiffer, 1860
 Helicina globulosa d’Orbigny, 1842
 Helicina holguinensis Clench & Aguayo, 1953
 Helicina lembeyana Poey, 1854
 Helicina monteiberia Sarasúa, 1976
 Helicina poeyi Pfeiffer, 1859
 Helicina reeveana Pfeiffer, 1848
 Helicina subdepressa Poey, 1854
 Helicina subglobulosa Poey, 1852
 Lucidella granulum (Gundlach in Pfeiffer, 1864)
 Lucidella granum (Pfeiffer, 1856)
 Lucidella rugosa (Pfeiffer, 1839)
 Lucidella tantilla (Pilsbry, 1902)
 Priotrochatella constellata (Morelet, 1847)
 Priotrochatella stellata (Velazquez in Poey, 1852)
 Priotrochatella torrei Clapp, 1918
 Semitrochatella alboviridis (Wright in Pfeiffer, 1864)
 Semitrochatella babei (Arango, 1876)
 Semitrochatella conica (Pfeiffer, 1839)
 Semitrochatella elongata (d’Orbigny, 1842)
 Semitrochatella fuscula (Gundlach in Pfeiffer, 1863)
 Troschelviana callosa (Poey, 1854)
 Troschelviana chrysochasma (Poey, 1853)
 Troschelviana continua (Gundlach in Pfeiffer, 1858)
 Troschelviana erythracea (Wright in Sowerby, 1866)
 Troschelviana granulum (Gundlach in Pfeiffer, 1864)
 Troschelviana hians (Poey, 1852)
 Troschelviana holguinensis (Aguayo, 1932)
 Troschelviana jugulata (Poey, 1858)
 Troschelviana mestrei (Arango, 1879)
 Troschelviana methfesseli (Pfeiffer, 1862)
 Troschelviana petitiana (d’Orbigny, 1842)
 Troschelviana pfeifferiana (Arango in Pfeiffer, 1866)
 Troschelviana pyramidalis (Sowerby, 1842)
 Troschelviana rubromarginata (Gundlach in Poey, 1858)
 Troschelviana rupestris (Pfeiffer, 1839)
 Troschelviana scopulorum (Morelet, 1849)
 Troschelviana spinipoma (Aguayo, 1943)
 Troschelviana tumidula (Clench & Aguayo, 1957)
 Ustronia acuminata (Velazquez in Poey, 1852)
 Ustronia sloanei (d’Orbigny, 1842)
 Viana regina (Morelet, 1849)

Proserpinidae
 Proserpina depresa (d’Orbigny, 1842)
 Proserpina globulosa (d’Orbigny, 1842)

Megalomastomatidae
 Farcimen alutaceum (Menke in Pfeiffer, 1846)
 Farcimen arangoi Torre & Bartsch, 1942
 Farcimen auriculatum (d’Orbigny, 1842)
 Farcimen bartschi Alcalde, 1945
 Farcimen bilabiatum Alcalde, 1945
 Farcimen bituberculatum (Sowerby, 1850)
 Farcimen camagueyanum Torre & Bartsch, 1942
 Farcimen cisnerosi Alcalde, 1945
 Farcimen guanense Torre & Bartsch, 1942
 Farcimen guitarti Torre & Bartsch, 1942
 Farcimen gundlachi (Pfeiffer, 1856)
 Farcimen hendersoni Torre & Bartsch, 1942
 Farcimen imperator Alcalde, 1945
 Farcimen jaumei Alcalde, 1945
 Farcimen leoninum (Pfeiffer, 1856)
 Farcimen magister Torre & Bartsch, 1942
 Farcimen majusculum Alcalde, 1945
 Farcimen mani (Poey, 1851)
 Farcimen najazaense Torre & Bartsch, 1942
 Farcimen obesum Torre & Bartsch, 1942
 Farcimen procer (Poey, 1854)
 Farcimen pseudotortum Torre & Bartsch, 1942
 Farcimen rocai Torre & Bartsch, 1942
 Farcimen seminudum (Poey, 1854)
 Farcimen subventricosum Torre & Bartsch, 1942
 Farcimen superbum Torre & Bartsch, 1942
 Farcimen torrei (Guitart, 1936)
 Farcimen tortum (Wood, 1828)
 Farcimen ungula (Poey, 1856)
 Farcimen ventricosum (d’Orbigny, 1842)
 Farcimen vignalense Torre & Bartsch, 1942
 Farcimen wrighti Torre & Bartsch, 1942
 Farcimen yunquense Torre & Bartsch, 1942

Neocyclotidae
 Crocidopoma gunglachi Torre & Bartsch, 1942
 Crocidopoma perdistinctum (Gundlach, 1858)

Pomatiidae
 Annularisca aberrans Torre & Barsch, 1941
 Annularisca alata (Pfeiffer, 1851)
 Annularisca alayoi (Jaume, 1984)
 Annularisca armasi (Jaume, 1984)
 Annularisca arquesi Torre & Bartsch, 1941
 Annularisca auricoma (Gundlach in Pfeiffer, 1859)
 Annularisca borroi (Jaume, 1984)
 Annularisca cumulata (Pfeiffer, 1863)
 Annularisca eburnea (Gundlach in Pfeiffer, 1858)
 Annularisca fragilis (Gundlach in Pfeiffer, 1859)
 Annularisca hendersoni Torre & Bartsch, 1941
 Annularisca heynemanni (Pfeiffer, 1864)
 Annularisca holguinensis Torre & Bartsch, 1941
 Annularisca incerta Torre & Bartsch, 1941
 Annularisca intercisa Torre & Bartsch, 1941
 Annularisca interstitialis (Gundlach in Pfeiffer, 1859)
 Annularisca mackinlayi (Gundlach in Pfeiffer, 1859)
 Annularisca mayariensis Torre & Bartsch, 1941
 Annularisca mayensis Torre & Bartsch, 1941
 Annularisca pallens Torre & Bartsch, 1941
 Annularisca prestoni (Ramsden, 1914)
 Annularisca pseudalata (Torre in Pilsbry & Henderson, 1912)
 Annularisca ramsdeni (Pilsbry & Henderson, 1912)
 Annularisca romeri (Pfeiffer, 1864)
 Annularisca tacrensis Torre & Bartsch, 1941
 Annularisca toroensis Torre & Bartsch, 1941
 Annularisca torrebartschi (Jaume,1984)
 Annularisca victoris Torre & Bartsch, 1941
 Annularisca wrighti Torre & Bartsch, 1941
 Annularisca yaterasensis (Pfeiffer, 1865)
 Annularisca yumuriensis Torre & Bartsch, 1941
 Annularisca yunquensis (Pfeiffer, 1860)
 Annularita majuscula (Morelet, 1851)
 Annularodes boqueronensis (Torre & Bartsch, 1941)
 Annularodes canoaensis (Torre & Bartsch, 1941)
 Annularodes cantarillensis (Torre & Bartsch, 1941)
 Annularodes indivisa (Welch, 1929)
 Annularodes inquisita (Pilsbry, 1929)
 Annularodes morenoi (Torre & Bartsch, 1941)
 Annularodes obsoleta (Torre & Bartsch, 1941)
 Annularodes perezi (Torre & Bartsch, 1941)
 Annularodes pilsbryi (Welch, 1929)
 Annularodes terneroensis (Torre & Bartsch, 1941)
 Annularodes unicinata (Arango, 1884)
 Annularops attenuata (Torre & Bartsch, 1941)
 Annularops blaini (Gundlach in Pfeiffer, 1863)
 Annularops coronadoi (Arango in Poey, 1867)
 Annularops perplexa (Torre & Bartsch, 1941)
 Annularops sauvallei (Gundlach in Pfeiffer, 1863)
 Annularops semicana (Morelet, 1851)
 Annularops tryoni (Arango, 1879)
 Annularops vannostrandi (Arango, 1876)
 Bermudezia bermudezi (Torre & Bartsch, 1941)
 Bermudezia biayensis (Torre & Bartsch, 1941)
 Bermudezia capestanyi (Torre & Bartsch, 1941)
 Bermudezia euglypta (Torre & Bartsch, 1941)
 Bermudezia eurystoma (Torre & Bartsch, 1941)
 Bermudezia lirata (Torre & Bartsch, 1941)
 Bermudezia najazaensis (Torre & Bartsch, 1941)
 Bermudezia obliterata (Torre & Bartsch, 1941)
 Bermudezia payroli (Torre & Bartsch, 1941)
 Bermudezia sifontesi (Torre & Bartsch, 1941)
 Blaesospira echinus (Wright in Pfeiffer, 1864)
 Blaesospira hortensiae Jaume, 1984
 Cubadamsiella beneitoi Fernández-Garcés, Espinosa & Ortea, 2003
 Cubadamsiella gratiosa (Torre & Bartsch, 1941)
 Cubadamsiella lamellata (Alcalde, 1945)
 Cubadamsiella lamellata Alcalde, 1945
 Cubadamsiella leoni (Torre & Bartsch, 1941)
 Cubadamsiella procax (Poey, 1851)
 Chondropoma abnatum (Gundlach in Pfeiffer, 1858)
 Chondropoma abtianum (Pfeiffer, 1862)
 Chondropoma aguayoi Torre & Bartsch, 1938
 Chondropoma alayoi Aguayo & Jaume, 1957
 Chondropoma alberti Clench & Aguayo, 1948
 Chondropoma alcaldei Jaume & Sánchez de Fuentes, 1943
 Chondropoma antonense Torre & Bartsch, 1938
 Chondropoma asperulum Aguayo, 1934
 Chondropoma auberianum (d’Orbigny, 1842)
 Chondropoma bairense Torre & Bartsch, 1938
 Chondropoma cabrerai Torre & Bartsch, 1938
 Chondropoma carenasense Pilsbry & Henderson, 1912
 Chondropoma cleti Aguayo, 1939
 Chondropoma cognatum Torre & Bartsch, 1938
 Chondropoma confertum (Poey, 1852)
 Chondropoma chordatum (Gundlach in Pfeiffer, 1858)
 Chondropoma daudinoti (Gundlach in Pfeiffer, 1860)
 Chondropoma delatreanum (d’Orbigny, 1842)
 Chondropoma dilatatum (Gundlach in Pfeiffer, 1859)
 Chondropoma eduardoi Aguayo, 1934
 Chondropoma erectum (Gundlach in Pfeiffer, 1858)
 Chondropoma ernesti Pfeiffer, 1862
 Chondropoma fuentesi Jaume & Alcalde, 1944
 Chondropoma garcianum Torre, 1913
 Chondropoma greenfieldi Torre & Bartsch, 1938
 Chondropoma guisaense Torre & Bartsch, 1938
 Chondropoma gutierrezi (Gundlach in Pfeiffer, 1856)
 Chondropoma holguinense (Aguayo, 1944)
 Chondropoma irradians (Shuttleworth in Pfeiffer, 1852)
 Chondropoma jaulense Torre & Bartsch, 1938
 Chondropoma laetum (Gutierrez in Poey, 1858)
 Chondropoma lembeyi Torre & Bartsch, 1938
 Chondropoma leoni Torre & Bartsch, 1938
 Chondropoma marginalbum (Gundlach in Pfeiffer, 1859)
 Chondropoma moestum (Shuttleworth in Pfeiffer, 1854)
 Chondropoma montanum Torre & Bartsch, 1938
 Chondropoma neglectum (Gundlach in Pfeiffer, 1856)
 Chondropoma nicolasi Torre & Bartsch, 1938
 Chondropoma nigriculum (Gundlach, 1860)
 Chondropoma obesum (Menke, 1830)
 Chondropoma oxytremum (Gundlach in Pfeiffer, 1860)
 Chondropoma perlatum (Gundlach in Poey,1858)
 Chondropoma pfeifferi Aguayo, 1945
 Chondropoma pfeifferianum (Poey, 1851)
 Chondropoma pictum (Pfeiffer, 1839)
 Chondropoma poeyanum (Orbigny, 1842)
 Chondropoma portuandoi Torre & Bartsch, 1938
 Chondropoma presasianum (Gundlach, 1863)
 Chondropoma revinctum (Poey, 1851)
 Chondropoma revocatum (Gundlach in Pfeiffer, 1857)
 Chondropoma rolandoi Aguayo, 1943
 Chondropoma rufopictum (Gundlach in Pfeiffer, 1860)
 Chondropoma solidulum (Gundlach in Pfeiffer, 1860)
 Chondropoma tejedori Clench & Aguayo, 1946
 Chondropoma tenuisculptum Aguayo, 1939
 Chondropoma textum (Gundlach in Pfeiffer, 1858)
 Chondropoma unilabiatum (Gundlach in Pfeiffer, 1860)
 Chondropoma vespertinum (Morelet, 1851)
 Chondropoma virgineum Aguayo, 1953
 Chondropoma wilcoxi Pilsbry & Henderson, 1912
 Chondropoma wrighti (Pfeiffer, 1862)
 Chondropoma yucayum (Presas in Pfeiffer, 1863)
 Chondropoma zorrillae Jaume, 1984
 Chondropomatus latum (Gundlach in Pfeiffer, 1858)
 Chondropomatus mimetica (Torre & Bartsch, 1941)
 Chondropometes bellisimum Torre & Bartsch, 1938
 Chondropometes concolor Torre & Bartsch, 1938
 Chondropometes eximium Torre & Bartsch, 1938
 Chondropometes exquisitum Torre & Bartsch, 1938
 Chondropometes latilabre (d’Orbigny, 1842)
 Chondropometes magnum Torre & Bartsch, 1938
 Chondropometes saccharinum Torre & Bartsch, 1938
 Chondropometes sagebieni (Poey, 1858)
 Chondropometes scopulorum Torre & Bartsch, 1938
 Chondropometes segregatum Torre & Bartsch, 1938
 Chondropometes torrei Bartsch, 1937
 Chondropometes vignalense (Wright in Pfeiffer, 1863)
 Chondrothyra affinis (Torre & Bartsch, 1938)
 Chondrothyra atristoma Torre & Bartsch, 1938
 Chondrothyra barbouri (Torre & Bartsch, 1938)
 Chondrothyra cerina (Torre & Bartsch, 1938)
 Chondrothyra crassa Torre & Bartsch, 1938
 Chondrothyra cumbrensis Torre & Bartsch, 1938
 Chondrothyra detectabilis (Torre & Bartsch, 1938)
 Chondrothyra egregia (Gundlach in Pfeiffer, 1856)
 Chondrothyra foveata (Gundlach in Pfeiffer, 1863)
 Chondrothyra gundlachi (Arango, 1862)
 Chondrothyra impresa (Torre & Bartsch, 1938)
 Chondrothyra incrassata (Wright in Pfeiffer, 1862)
 Chondrothyra natensoni Torre & Bartsch, 1938
 Chondrothyra parilis (Torre & Bartsch, 1938)
 Chondrothyra percrassa (Wright in Pfeiffer, 1864)
 Chondrothyra reticulata (Torre & Bartsch, 1938)
 Chondrothyra rutila Torre & Bartsch, 1938
 Chondrothyra shuttleworthi (Pfeiffer, 1851)
 Chondrothyra subegregia Torre & Bartsch, 1938
 Chondrothyra tenebrata (Torre & Bartsch, 1938)
 Chondrothyra tosta Torre & Bartsch, 1938
 Chondrothyra uniplicata Torre & Bartsch, 1938
 Chondrothyra wrighti Torre & Bartsch, 1938
 Chondrothyrella assimilis (Gundlach in Pfeiffer, 1863)
 Chondrothyrella claudicans (Poey, 1851)
 Chondrothyrella cuzcoensis Torre & Bartsch, 1938
 Chondrothyrella excisa (Gundlach in Pfeiffer, 1863)
 Chondrothyrella ottonis (Pfeiffer, 1846)
 Chondrothyrella paredonis Sánchez Roig, 1951
 Chondrothyrella perturbata Torre & Bartsch, 1938
 Chondrothyrella petricosa (Morelet, 1851)
 Chondrothyrella pudica (d’Orbigny, 1842)
 Chondrothyrella tenebrosa (Morelet, 1849)
 Chondrothyrium alcaldei Jaume & Sánchez de Fuentes, 1943
 Chondrothyrium borroi Jaume & Sánchez de Fuentes, 1943
 Chondrothyrium crenimargo (Pfeiffer, 1858)
 Chondrothyrium mortiarum Sánchez Roig, 1951
 Chondrothyrium tejedori Sánchez Roig, 1951
 Chondrothyrium torrei Jaume & Sánchez de Fuentes, 1943
 Chondrothyrium violaceum (Pfeiffer, 1858)
 Dallsiphona dalli (Torre & Henderson, 1920)
 Diploma arangoi (Jaume, 1984)
 Diploma architectonica (Gundlach in Pfeiffer, 1859)
 Diploma songoensis (Torre & Bartsch, 1941)
 Diploma torrei (Ramsden, 1915)
 Diploma varonai (Jaume, 1984)
 Diploma zayasi (Jaume, 1984)
 Eutudora agassizi (Charpentier in Pfeiffer, 1852)
 Eutudora cabrerai (Torre & Bartsch, 1941)
 Eutudora camoensis (Torre & Bartsch, 1941)
 Eutudora catenata (Gould, 1843)
 Eutudora jimenoi (Arango in Pfeiffer, 1864)
 Eutudora limbifera (Menke in Pfeiffer, 1846)
 Eutudora transitoria (Torre & Bartsch, 1941)
 Eutudorops complanata (Torre & Bartsch, 1941)
 Eutudorops pulverulenta (Wright in Pfeiffer, 1864)
 Eutudorops rocai (Torre & Bartsch, 1941)
 Eutudorops rotundata (Poey, 1851)
 Eutudorops torquata (Gutierrez in Poey, 1858)
 Eutudorops troscheli (Pfeiffer, 1864)
 Eutudorops undosa (Gundlach in Pfeiffer, 1863)
 Eutudorops welchi (Torre et Bartsch, 1941)
 Guajaibona petrei (d’Orbigny, 1842)
 Gundlachtudora decolorata (Gundlach in Pfeiffer, 1859)
 Hendersonina bermudezi Torre & Bartsch, 1938
 Hendersonina canaliculata (Gundlach in Pfeiffer, 1863)
 Hendersonina cirrata (Wright in Pfeiffer, 1867)
 Hendersonina deceptor (Arango, 1882)
 Hendersonina discolorans (Wright in Pfeiffer, 1863)
 Hendersonina echinulata (Wright in Pfeiffer, 1863)
 Hendersonina hamlini (Arango, 1882)
 Hendersonina hendersoni (Torre, 1909)
 Hendersonina maculata Torre & Bartsch, 1938
 Hendersonina mendax (Torre & Bartsch, 1938)
 Hendersonina scobina (Gundlach in Pfeiffer, 1863)
 Hendersonina sinuosa (Wright in Pfeiffer, 1862)
 Jaumeia notata (Torre & Bartsch, 1941)
 Juannularia arguta (Pfeiffer, 1858)
 Juannularia perplicata (Gundlach, 1857)
 Limadora garciana (Aguayo, 1932)
 Limadora scabrata (Torre & Bartsch, 1941)
 Limadora tollini (Ramsden, 1915)
 Limadorex limonensis (Torre & Bartsch, 1941)
 Opisthocoelicum dubium Sánchez Roig, 1949
 Opisthocoelicum excurrens (Gundlach in Pfeiffer, 1860)
 Opisthocoelicum lamellicostatum (Torre & Henderson, 1921)
 Opisthocoelicum occultum (Torre & Henderson, 1921)
 Opisthocoelicum opisthocoele Torre & Bartsch, 1941
 Opisthocoelicum paradoxum (Torre & Henderson, 1921)
 Opisthocoelicum simulans Torre & Bartsch, 1941
 Opisthosiphon aguilerianum (Arango, 1876)
 Opisthosiphon andrewsi Welch, 1929
 Opisthosiphon apertum Torre & Henderson, 1920
 Opisthosiphon bacillum Torre & Bartsch, 1941
 Opisthosiphon banaoense Torre & Henderson, 1921
 Opisthosiphon bermudezi Torre & Bartsch, 1941
 Opisthosiphon berryi Clapp, 1919
 Opisthosiphon bioscai Torre & Henderson, 1920
 Opisthosiphon caguanense Torre & Bartsch, 1941
 Opisthosiphon caroli Aguayo, 1932
 Opisthosiphon claudens Torre & Bartsch, 1941
 Opisthosiphon cucullatum Torre & Bartsch, 1941
 Opisthosiphon cunaguae Welch, 1929
 Opisthosiphon detectum Torre & Henderson, 1920
 Opisthosiphon deviatum Torre & Bartsch, 1941
 Opisthosiphon echinatum (Gundlach in Pfeiffer, 1857)
 Opisthosiphon evanidum Torre & Henderson, 1921
 Opisthosiphon greenfieldi Torre & Bartsch, 1941
 Opisthosiphon guanajaense Torre & Bartsch, 1941
 Opisthosiphon insularum Torre & Bartsch, 1941
 Opisthosiphon judasense Torre & Henderson, 1920
 Opisthosiphon lamellosum Torre & Bartsch, 1941
 Opisthosiphon litorale Torre & Bartsch, 1941
 Opisthosiphon manatiense Torre & Bartsch, 1941
 Opisthosiphon moreletianum (Petit, 1850)
 Opisthosiphon obtectum Torre & Henderson, 1920
 Opisthosiphon obturatum Torre & Henderson, 1920
 Opisthosiphon palmeri Torre & Bartsch, 1941
 Opisthosiphon paredonense Torre & Henderson, 1920
 Opisthosiphon plateroense Torre & Bartsch, 1941
 Opisthosiphon plicatum Torre & Bartsch, 1941
 Opisthosiphon poeyi Torre & Bartsch, 1941
 Opisthosiphon prominulum Torre & Bartsch, 1941
 Opisthosiphon protactum Torre & Henderson, 1920
 Opisthosiphon pupoides (Morelet, 1849)
 Opisthosiphon quesadai Aguayo, 1932
 Opisthosiphon quinti Torre & Bartsch, 1941
 Opisthosiphon sabinalense Sánchez Roig, 1949
 Opisthosiphon sainzi Aguayo, 1934
 Opisthosiphon salustii Torre & Henderson, 1920
 Opisthosiphon sanchezi Torre & Bartsch, 1941
 Opisthosiphon sculptum (Gundlach in Pfeiffer, 1857)
 Opisthosiphon sosai Torre & Bartsch, 1941
 Opisthosiphon subobtectum Torre & Bartsch, 1941
 Opisthosiphon subobturatum Torre & Henderson, 1920
 Opisthosiphon tersum Torre & Henderson, 1921
 Opisthosiphon torrei Welch, 1929
 Opisthosiphon turiguanoense Torre & Bartsch, 1941
 Opistosiphon conicus Aguayo & Sánchez Roig, 1949
 Ramsdenia bufo (Pfeiffer, 1864)
 Ramsdenia natensoni (Torre & Bartsch, 1941)
 Ramsdenia nobilitata (Gundlach in Poey, 1858)
 Ramsdenia perspectiva (Gundlach in Pfeiffer, 1859)
 Rhytidopoma clathratum (Gould, 1842)
 Rhytidopoma coronatum (Poey in Pfeiffer, 1856)
 Rhytidopoma hespericum Torre & Bartsch, 1941
 Rhytidopoma honestum (Poey, 1851)
 Rhytidopoma isabelae Aguayo & Jaume, 1953
 Rhytidopoma nodulatum (Poey, 1851)
 Rhytidopoma occidentale Torre & Bartsch, 1941
 Rhytidopoma pinense Torre & Bartsch, 1941
 Rhytidopoma rugulosum (Pfeiffer, 1839)
 Rhytidopoma scalarinum Jaume & Sánchez de Fuentes, 1944
 Rhytidopoma violaceum Jaume & Sánchez de Fuentes, 1944
 Rhytidopoma wrightianum (Gundlach in Arango, 1881)
 Rhytidothyra bilabiata (d’Orbigny, 1842)
 Rhytidothyra jacobsoni Alcalde, 1948
 Subannularia jeannereti (Pfeiffer, 1861)
 Subannularia lacheri (Pfeiffer, 1861)
 Subannularia pujalsi Aguayo, 1953
 Subannularia storchi (Pfeiffer, 1861)
 Torrella deficiens (Gundlach in Pfeiffer, 1857)
 Torrella immersa (Gundlach in Pfeiffer, 1857)
 Torrella simpsoni Henderson & Bartsch, 1920
 Torrilla emmae Jaume & Sánchez de Fuentes, 1943
 Torrilla torreiana (Gundlach in Arango, 1878)
 Torrilla trinidadensis Torre & Bartsch, 1941
 Troschelvindex agrestis (Pfeiffer, 1862)
 Troschelvindex alayoi Aguayo & Jaume, 1947
 Troschelvindex arangiana (Gundlach in Pfeiffer, 1857
 Troschelvindex auriflexum Aguayo, 1953
 Troschelvindex barbouri (Torre & Bartsch, 1941)
 Troschelvindex bebini (Arango, 1865)
 Troschelvindex candeana (d’Orbigny, 1842)
 Troschelvindex freirei Aguayo & Jaume, 1947
 Troschelvindex inculta (Poey, 1851)
 Troschelvindex jiguanensis (Pfeiffer, 1861)
 Troschelvindex minia (Gundlach in Poey, 1858)
 Troschelvindex rocai (Torre & Bartsch, 1941)
 Troschelvindex tracta (Gundlach in Poey, 1858)
 Tudorina rangelina (Poey, 1851)
 Wrightudora aguayoi (Torre & Bartsch, 1941)
 Wrightudora arcticoronata (Torre & Bartsch, 1941)
 Wrightudora asperata (Torre & Bartsch, 1941)
 Wrightudora banensis Aguayo, 1944
 Wrightudora bermudezi (Torre & Bartsch, 1941)
 Wrightudora clenchi Aguayo & Jaume, 1954
 Wrightudora crassiuscula (Torre & Bartsch, 1941)
 Wrightudora cristata (Torre & Bartsch, 1941)
 Wrightudora enode (Gundlach in Pfeiffer, 1860)
 Wrightudora garridoiana (Gundlach in Pfeiffer, 1860)
 Wrightudora gibarana Aguayo, 1943
 Wrightudora gundlachi (Torre & Bartsch, 1941)
 Wrightudora laevistria Aguayo & Sánchez Roig, 1949
 Wrightudora obesa (Torre & Bartsch, 1941)
 Wrightudora recta (Gundlach in Pfeiffer, 1863)
 Wrightudora semicoronata (Gundlach in Pfeiffer, 1861)
 Wrightudora suavis (Torre & Bartsch, 1941)
 Wrightudora tuberculata (Torre & Bartsch, 1941)
 Wrightudora varicosa (Torre & Bartsch, 1941)
 Xenophoma aguayoi Torre & Bartsch, 1941
 Xenophoma hendersoni Torre & Bartsch, 1941
 Xenophoma humboldtianum (Pfeiffer, 1867)
 Xenophoma hystrix (Wright in Pfeiffer, 1862)
 Xenophoma spinosissimum Torre & Bartsch, 1941
 Xenopoides delicatulum Torre & Bartsch, 1941

Truncatellidae
 Taheitia elongata (Poey in Pfeiffer, 1856)
 Taheitia filicosta (Gundlach in Poey, 1858)
 Taheitia lirata (Poey, 1858)
 Taheitia wrighti (Pfeiffer, 1862)
 Truncatella caribaensis Reeve, 1826
 Truncatella pulchella Pfeiffer, 1839
 Truncatella scalaris (Michaud, 1830)

Veronicellidae
 Leidyula floridana (Leidy & Binney in Binney, 1851)
 Sarasinula plebeia (Fisher, 1868)
 Veronicella cubense (Pfeiffer, 1840) or Veronicella cubensis (Pfeiffer, 1840)
 Veronicella sloanei (Cuvier, 1817)
 Veronicella tenax Baker, 1931

Succineidae
 Succinea angustior (C. B. Adams, 1850)
 Succinea arangoi Pfeiffer, 1866
 Succinea aurea Lea, 1841
 Succinea brevis Dunker in Pfeiffer, 1850
 Succinea fulgens Lea, 1841
 Succinea gundlachi Pfeiffer, 1852
 Succinea macta Poey, 1858
 Succinea nobilis Poey, 1853
 Succinea ochracina Gundlach in Poey, 1858
 Succinea sagra d’Orbigny, 1842
 Succinea tenuis Gundlach in Poey, 1858

Pupillidae
 Pupoides marginatus nitidulus (Pfeiffer, 1839)

Strobilopsidae
 Strobilops hubbardi (A. D. Brown, 1861)

Vertiginidae
 Bothriopupa tenuidens (C. B. Adams, 1845)
 Gastrocopta barbadensis (Pfeiffer, 1853)
 Gastrocopta contracta (Say, 1822)
 Gastrocopta pellucida (Pfeiffer, 1840)
 Gastrocopta rupicola marginalba (Pfeiffer, 1840)
 Gastrocopta servilis (Gould, 1843)
 Pupisoma dioscoricola (C. B. Adams, 1845)
 Sterkia antillensis Pilsbry, 1920
 Vertigo cubana Crosse, 1890
 Vertigo gouldii (Binney, 1843)
 Vertigo milium (Gould, 1840)
 Vertigo neglecta Arango in Poey, 1856
 Vertigo ovata (Say, 1822)
 Vertigo torrei Aguayo & Jaume, 1934

Orthalicidae
 Bulimulus sepulchralis Poey, 1852
 Drymaeus dominicus (Reeve, 1850)
 Liguus blainianus (Poey, 1851)
 Liguus fasciatus (Müller, 1774)
 Liguus flammellus Clench, 1934
 Liguus vittatus (Swainson, 1822)

Cerionidae
 Cerion acuticostatum Sánchez Roig, 1948
 Cerion aguayoi Torre & Clench, 1932
 Cerion alberti Clench & Aguayo, 1949
 Cerion alleni Torre, 1929
 Cerion arangoi (Pilsbry & Vanatta, 1896)
 Cerion banesense Clench & Aguayo, 1949
 Cerion barroi Aguayo & Jaume, 1957
 Cerion basistriatum Pilsbry & Vanatta, 1895
 Cerion bioscai Aguayo & Jaume, 1951
 Cerion blanesi Clench & Aguayo, 1951
 Cerion cabocruzense Pilsbry & Torre, 1943
 Cerion caroli Aguayo & Torre, 1951
 Cerion catherwoodianum Wurtz, 1950
 Cerion ceiba Clench, 1948
 Cerion chaparra Aguayo & Sánchez Roig, 1953
 Cerion chaplini Wurtz, 1950
 Cerion circumscriptum Aguayo & Jaume, 1951
 Cerion cisneroi Clench & Aguayo, 1951
 Cerion cobarrubia Aguayo & Jaume, 1951
 Cerion columbinus Sánchez Roig, 1951
 Cerion coutini Sánchez Roig, 1951
 Cerion crassiusculum Torre in Pilsbry & Vanatta, 1899
 Cerion cyclostomum (Küster, 1841)
 Cerion dimidiatum (Pfeiffer, 1847)
 Cerion disforme Clench & Aguayo, 1946
 Cerion dorotheae Aguayo & Jaume, 1951
 Cerion ebriolum Aguayo & Jaume, 1951
 Cerion feltoni Sánchez Roig, 1951
 Cerion geophilum Clench & Aguayo, 1949
 Cerion grilloensis Sánchez Roig, 1951
 Cerion gundlachi (Pfeiffer, 1852)
 Cerion herrerai Aguayo & Jaume, 1951
 Cerion hessei Clench & Aguayo, 1949
 Cerion humberti Clench & Aguayo, 1949
 Cerion hyperlissum Pilsbry & Vanatta, 1896
 Cerion incrassatum (Sowerby, 1876)
 Cerion infandulum Aguayo & Torre, 1951
 Cerion infandum (Shuttleworth in Poey, 1858)
 Cerion iostomum (Pfeiffer, 1854)
 Cerion johnsoni Pilsbry & Vanatta, 1895
 Cerion josephi Clench & Aguayo, 1949
 Cerion kusteri (Pfeiffer, 1854)
 Cerion laureani Clench & Aguayo, 1951
 Cerion longidens Pilsbry, 1902
 Cerion macrodon Aguayo & Jaume, 1951
 Cerion magister Pilsbry & Vanatta, 1896
 Cerion manatiense Aguayo & Jaume, 1951
 Cerion marielinum Torre in Pilsbry, 1927
 Cerion maritimum (Pfeiffer, 1839)
 Cerion microdon Pilsbry & Vanatta, 1896
 Cerion microstonum [or microstomum] (Pfeiffer, 1854)
 Cerion miramarae Sánchez Roig, 1951
 Cerion multicostum (Küster, 1845)
 Cerion mumia (Bruguiére, 1792)
 Cerion mumiola (Pfeiffer, 1839)
 Cerion nipense Aguayo, 1953
 Cerion orientale Clench & Aguayo, 1951
 Cerion palmeri Sánchez Roig, 1948
 Cerion pandionis Aguayo & Jaume, 1951
 Cerion paredonis Pilsbry, 1902
 Cerion pastelilloensis Sánchez Roig, 1951
 Cerion paucicostatum Torre, 1929
 Cerion paucisculptum Clench & Aguayo, 1952
 Cerion peracutum Clench & Aguayo, 1951
 Cerion pinerium Dall, 1895
 Cerion politum (Maynard, 1896)
 Cerion prestoni Sánchez Roig, 1951
 Cerion pretiosus Sánchez Roig, 1951
 Cerion pseudocyclostomum Aguayo & Sánchez Roig, 1953
 Cerion ramsdeni Torre in Welch, 1934
 Cerion ricardi Clench & Aguayo, 1951
 Cerion saetiae Sánchez Roig, 1948
 Cerion sagraianum (Pfeiffer, 1847)
 Cerion sainthilarius Sánchez Roig, 1951
 Cerion salvatori Torre in Pilsbry, 1927
 Cerion sanctacruzense Aguayo & Jaume, 1951
 Cerion sanctamariae Aguayo & Jaume, 1951
 Cerion sanzi Blanes in Pilsbry & Vanatta, 1898
 Cerion scalarinum (Gundlach in Pfeiffer, 1860)
 Cerion scopulorum Aguayo & Jaume, 1951
 Cerion sculptum (Poey, 1858)
 Cerion sisal Clench & Aguayo, 1952
 Cerion tanamensis Sánchez Roig, 1951
 Cerion tenuilabre (Gundlach in Pfeiffer, 1870)
 Cerion torrei Blanes in Pilsbry & Vanatta, 1898
 Cerion tridentatun Pilsbry & Vanatta, 1895
 Cerion vanattai Clench & Aguayo, 1951
 Cerion venustum (Poey, 1858)
 Cerion victor Torre, 1929
 Cerion vulneratum (Küster, 1855)

Urocoptidae
 Acracoptis browni Torre & Bartsch, 2008
 Acracoptis delectabilis (Pilsbry, 1929)
 Acracoptis euclasta Torre & Bartsch, 2008
 Acracoptis florenciana (Pilsbry, 1929)
 Acracoptis rosaperdita Torre & Bartsch, 2008
 Acracoptis welchi Torre & Bartsch, 2008
 Amphistemma pilsbryana (Ramsden, 1914)
 Arangia aequatoris (Morelet, 1873)
 Arangia guantanamensis Torre & Bartsch, 2008
 Arangia gundlachi Torre & Bartsch, 2008
 Arangia johani Torre & Bartsch, 2008
 Arangia perfecta (Pilsbry, 1942)
 Arangia scobinata (Torre & Ramsden, 1915)
 Arangia sowerbyana (Pfeiffer, 1846)
 Badiofaux asinorum Torre & Bartsch, 2008
 Badiofaux cavernicola Torre & Bartsch, 2008
 Badiofaux elizabethae Torre & Bartsch, 2008
 Badiofaux gutierrezi (Arango, 1976)
 Badiofaux mendozana (Pilsbry, 1928)
 Badiofaux mogotensis Torre & Bartsch, 2008
 Badiofaux monelasmus (Pilsbry, 1928)
 Badiofaux plumbea (Wright in Pfeiffer, 1864)
 Badiofaux trilamellata (Pfeiffer, 1864)
 Bialasmus accola Torre & Bartsch, 2008
 Bialasmus bilamellata Torre & Bartsch, 2008
 Bialasmus imparata (Arango, 1882)
 Brachypodella angulifera (Gundlach in Pfeiffer, 1858)
 Brachypodella baracoensis Torre & Bartsch, 2008
 Brachypodella brooksiana (Gundlach in Pfeiffer, 1859)
 Brachypodella decipiens Torre & Bartsch, 2008
 Brachypodella electricola Torre & Bartsch, 2008
 Brachypodella elongatula Torre & Bartsch, 2008
 Brachypodella emerita Spence, 1927
 Brachypodella frederici Torre & Bartsch, 2008
 Brachypodella gracilior Torre & Bartsch, 2008
 Brachypodella lescallei Torre & Bartsch, 2008
 Brachypodella libanoensis Torre & Bartsch, 2008
 Brachypodella menciae Torre & Bartsch, 2008
 Brachypodella minuta (Gundlach in Pfeiffer, 1859)
 Brachypodella modica Torre & Bartsch, 2008
 Brachypodella prevali Torre & Bartsch, 2008
 Brachypodella ramsdeni Torre, 1914
 Brachypodella tanamensis Torre & Bartsch, 2008
 Brachypodella torreana Ramsden, 1914
 Brachypodella turcasiana (Gundlach in Pfeiffer, 1859)
 Callocoptis abdita (Arango, 1880)
 Callocoptis abraensis Torre & Bartsch, 2008
 Callocoptis hubbardi Torre & Bartsch, 2008
 Callocoptis vesperalis Torre & Bartsch, 2008
 Callonia dautzenbergiana (Crosse)
 Callonia elizabethae Torre & Bartsch, 2008
 Callonia ellioti (Poey, 1857)
 Callonia gemmata (Pilsbry, 1927)
 Callonia lowei (Torre, 1927)
 Capillacea angustior (Wright in Pfeiffer, 1864)
 Capillacea capillacea (Pfeiffer, 1863)
 Capillacea pulcherrima Torre & Bartsch, 2008
 Carcinostemma biperlata Torre & Bartsch, 2008
 Carcinostemma perlata (Gundlach in Pfeiffer, 1859)
 Centralia alvearis (Torre, 1911)
 Centralia bonachensis Torre & Bartsch, 2008
 Centralia chambaensis (Pilsbry, 1929)
 Centralia cioniscus (Torre, 1911)
 Centralia concolor Torre & Bartsch, 2008
 Centralia dilatata (Torre, 1911)
 Centralia dimidiata (Torre, 1911)
 Centralia fulva (Torre, 1911)
 Centralia intermedia (Torre, 1911)
 Centralia intuscoarctata (Torre, 1911)
 Centralia jungalitensis Torre & Bartsch, 2008
 Centralia martinezi Torre & Bartsch, 2008
 Centralia mayajiguensis (Torre, 1911)
 Centralia oblicua (Pfeiffer, 1863)
 Centralia obscura Torre & Bartsch, 2008
 Centralia torreana (Pilsbry, 1929)
 Centralia tuba (Torre, 1911)
 Centralia turgida (Torre, 1911)
 Centralia villarensis (Torre, 1911)
 Centralia yaguajayensis Torre & Bartsch, 2008
 Cochlodinella agustini Torre & Bartsch, 2008
 Cochlodinella alternans Torre & Bartsch, 2008
 Cochlodinella atra Torre & Bartsch, 2008
 Cochlodinella atropurpurea (Arango, 1882)
 Cochlodinella ayuaensis Torre & Bartsch, 2008
 Cochlodinella bermudezi Torre & Bartsch, 2008
 Cochlodinella blainiana (Gundlach in Pfeiffer, 1863)
 Cochlodinella broquelesensis Torre & Bartsch, 2008
 Cochlodinella caiguanaboensis Torre & Bartsch, 2008
 Cochlodinella canaleticola Torre & Bartsch, 2008
 Cochlodinella corralillensis Torre & Bartsch, 2008
 Cochlodinella dossierraensis Torre & Bartsch, 2008
 Cochlodinella grossior Torre & Bartsch, 2008
 Cochlodinella hendersoni Torre & Bartsch, 2008
 Cochlodinella illamellata (Wright in Pfeiffer, 1864)
 Cochlodinella jumaguaensis Torre & Bartsch, 2008
 Cochlodinella lacteoflua (Pilsbry, 1903)
 Cochlodinella laureani Torre & Bartsch, 2008
 Cochlodinella manzanillensis (Torre, 1930)
 Cochlodinella martinezi Torre & Bartsch, 2008
 Cochlodinella mediana (Pilsbry, 1913)
 Cochlodinella mixta (Wright in Pfeiffer, 1865)
 Cochlodinella mulo Torre & Bartsch, 2008
 Cochlodinella nana Torre & Bartsch, 2008
 Cochlodinella nipensis Torre & Bartsch, 2008
 Cochlodinella pelecostata Torre & Bartsch, 2008
 Cochlodinella petri Torre & Bartsch, 2008
 Cochlodinella poeyana (d’Orbigny, 1842)
 Cochlodinella presasiana (Pefeiffer, 1866)
 Cochlodinella pulchra Torre & Bartsch, 2008
 Cochlodinella rectaxis (Pilsbry, 1930)
 Cochlodinella regis Torre & Bartsch, 2008
 Cochlodinella saguaensis Torre & Bartsch, 2008
 Cochlodinella sculpturata Torre & Bartsch, 2008
 Cochlodinella soluta (Pfeiffer, 1863)
 Cochlodinella striatissima Torre & Bartsch, 2008
 Cochlodinella turiguanoensis Torre & Bartsch, 2008
 Cochlodinella variegata (Pfeiffer, 1842)
 Cochlodinella victoris Torre & Bartsch, 2008
 Geminicoptis rocai (Torre, 1929)
 Geminicoptis terebella (Torre, 1929)
 Gongylostoma arangiana (Gundlach in Arango, 1878)
 Gongylostoma artemisiae (Gundlach in Pfeiffer, 1863)
 Gongylostoma cardenasi Torre & Bartsch, 2008
 Gongylostoma confusa (Arango, 1882)
 Gongylostoma consimilis Torre & Bartsch, 2008
 Gongylostoma elegans (Pfeiffer, 1839)
 Gongylostoma fortis (Gundlach in Pfeiffer, 1864)
 Gongylostoma heterosculpta (Torre, 1932)
 Gongylostoma hilleiana (Gundlach in Arango, 1880)
 Gongylostoma lirata (Jimeno in Pfeiffer, 1864)
 Gongylostoma michaeli Torre & Bartsch, 2008
 Gongylostoma peccatrix Torre & Bartsch, 2008
 Gongylostoma pipianensis Torre & Bartsch, 2008
 Gongylostoma planospira (Pfeiffer, 1855)
 Gongylostoma proxima Torre & Bartsch, 2008
 Gongylostoma spatiosa Torre & Bartsch, 2008
 Gongylostomella banaoensis Torre & Bartsch, 2008
 Gongylostomella bicolor Torre & Bartsch, 2008
 Gongylostomella canteroiana (Gundlach in Arango, 1876)
 Gongylostomella contentiosa (Arango, 1884)
 Gongylostomella creola (Aguayo, 1934)
 Gongylostomella fortis Torre & Bartsch, 2008
 Gongylostomella gundlachi Torre & Bartsch, 2008
 Gongylostomella hilleri (Pfeiffer, 1862)
 Gongylostomella inaudita Torre & Bartsch, 2008
 Gongylostomella mayensis (Torre & Ramsden, 1915)
 Gongylostomella pilsbryi Torre & Bartsch, 2008
 Gongylostomella portuondoi Torre & Bartsch, 2008
 Gongylostomella regis Torre & Bartsch, 2008
 Gongylostomella semicostata Torre & Bartsch, 2008
 Gongylostomella strigis Torre & Bartsch, 2008
 Gongylostomella terneroensis Torre & Bartsch, 2008
 Gongylostomella turneri (Pilsbry, 1930)
 Gongylostomella vigiana Torre & Bartsch, 2008
 Gongylostomella wrighti (Pfeiffer, 1862)
 Heterocoptis bermudezi Torre & Bartsch, 2008
 Heterocoptis biayensis Torre & Bartsch, 2008
 Heterocoptis bicorda Torre & Bartsch, 2008
 Heterocoptis cachimboensis Torre & Bartsch, 2008
 Heterocoptis cara (Pilsbry & Henderson, 1912)
 Heterocoptis cavicostata Torre & Bartsch, 2008
 Heterocoptis chorrillensis Torre & Bartsch, 2008
 Heterocoptis clava Torre & Bartsch, 2008
 Heterocoptis guaicanamarensis Torre & Bartsch, 2008
 Heterocoptis guitarti Torre & Bartsch, 2008
 Heterocoptis jovai Torre & Bartsch, 2008
 Heterocoptis mellacea Torre & Bartsch, 2008
 Heterocoptis morenoi Torre & Bartsch, 2008
 Heterocoptis najasaensis Torre & Bartsch, 2008
 Heterocoptis parallela (Torre, 1912)
 Heterocoptis rubiola Torre & Bartsch, 2008
 Heterocoptis salvatoris Torre & Bartsch, 2008
 Heterocoptis sanchezi Torre & Bartsch, 2008
 Heterocoptis sublapidea Torre & Bartsch, 2008
 Heterocoptis tabacaria Torre & Bartsch, 2008
 Heterocoptis whittami Torre & Bartsch, 2008
 Idiostemma alfredoi Franke & Fernández Velázquez, 2007
 Idiostemma interrupta (Gundlach in Pfeiffer, 1857)
 Idiostemma scabrosa (Gundlach in Pfeiffer, 1859)
 Idiostemma uncata (Gundlach in Pfeiffer, 1859)
 Johaniceramus longus (Henderson, 1915)
 Levistemma peculiaris Torre & Bartsch, 2008
 Liocallonia andresensis Torre & Bartsch, 2008
 Liocallonia antoniensis Torre & Bartsch, 2008
 Liocallonia arthuri Torre & Bartsch, 2008
 Liocallonia attenuata Torre & Bartsch, 2008
 Liocallonia bierigi Torre & Bartsch, 2008
 Liocallonia bosquensis Torre & Bartsch, 2008
 Liocallonia brunnescens (Gundlach in Pfeiffer, 1863)
 Liocallonia cacarajicaraensis Torre & Bartsch, 2008
 Liocallonia canaletensis Torre & Bartsch, 2008
 Liocallonia chinensis Torre & Bartsch, 2008
 Liocallonia clara (Wright in Pfeiffer, 1865)
 Liocallonia cortinoi Torre & Bartsch, 2008
 Liocallonia cuestai (Torre, 1930)
 Liocallonia cumbrensis Torre & Bartsch, 2008
 Liocallonia densicostata Torre & Bartsch, 2008
 Liocallonia discrepans Torre & Bartsch, 2008
 Liocallonia dolores Torre & Bartsch, 2008
 Liocallonia galalonensis Torre & Bartsch, 2008
 Liocallonia guirensis (Gunldach in Pfeiffer, 1876)
 Liocallonia infortunata (Arango, 1882)
 Liocallonia itineris Torre & Bartsch, 2008
 Liocallonia jaguaensis Torre & Bartsch, 2008
 Liocallonia jaumei Torre & Bartsch, 2008
 Liocallonia minaensis Torre & Bartsch, 2008
 Liocallonia natensoni Torre & Bartsch, 2008
 Liocallonia notata (Gundlach in Pfeiffer, 1863)
 Liocallonia oligomesa (Pilsbry, 1903)
 Liocallonia palmae (Gundlach in Pfeiffer, 1876)
 Liocallonia patruelis (Arango, 1876)
 Liocallonia propinqua (Gundlach in Arango, 1882)
 Liocallonia saxosa (Poey, 1857)
 Liocallonia triplicata (Arango, 1882)
 Liocallonia vincta (Gundlach in Pfeiffer, 1863)
 Liocallonia volubilis (Morelet, 1849)
 Liocalloniatacotacoensis Torre & Bartsch, 2008
 Macroceramus aguadoresensis Torre & Bartsch, 2008
 Macroceramus amicorum Torre & Bartsch, 2008
 Macroceramus arangoi Pfeiffer, 1866
 Macroceramus bioscai Torre & Bartsch, 2008
 Macroceramus blaini Arango in Pfeiffer, 1866
 Macroceramus canimarensis (Pfeiffer, 1839)
 Macroceramus catenatus Gundlach in Pfeiffer, 1859
 Macroceramus claudens Gundlach in Pfeiffer, 1859
 Macroceramus clerchi Arango in Pfeiffer, 1866
 Macroceramus costulatus Gundlach in Pfeiffer, 1859
 Macroceramus crenatus Gundlach in Pfeiffer, 1863
 Macroceramus cuzcoensis Torre & Bartsch, 2008
 Macroceramus festus Gundlach in Pfeiffer, 1859
 Macroceramus garcianus Torre & Bartsch, 2008
 Macroceramus giganteus Sánchez Roig
 Macroceramus grobei Pfeiffer, 1862
 Macroceramus gundlachi (Pfeiffer, 1852)
 Macroceramus hendersoni Torre, 1909
 Macroceramus inermis Gundlach in Pfeiffer, 1858
 Macroceramus interrogationis Torre & Bartsch, 2008
 Macroceramus jaumei Sanchez Roig
 Macroceramus jeannereti Gundlach in Pfeiffer, 1858
 Macroceramus muscatus Torre & Bartsch, 2008
 Macroceramus notatus (Gundlach in Pfeiffer, 1859)
 Macroceramus parallelus Arango in Pfeiffer, 1866
 Macroceramus pazi Gundlach in Pfeiffer, 1858
 Macroceramus picturatus Torre & Bartsch, 2008
 Macroceramus pictus Gundlach in Pfeiffer, 1858
 Macroceramus pupoides Pfeiffer, 1863
 Macroceramus regis Pilsbry, 1930
 Macroceramus rotundibasis Pilsbry, 1913
 Macroceramus sanchezi Torre & Bartsch, 2008
 Macroceramus siboneyensis Torre & Bartsch, 2008
 Macroceramus simplex Pfeiffer, 1863
 Macroceramus torrei Pilsbry, 1930
 Macroceramus utriculus Torre & Bartsch, 2008
 Macroceramus vanattai Pilsbry, 1930
 Macroceramus variabilis Pfeiffer, 1863
 Macroceramus wrighti Torre & Bartsch, 2008
 Macroceramus yateresense Sánchez Roig
 Microceramus abraensis Torre & Bartsch, 2008
 Microceramus aguayoi Torre & Bartsch, 2008
 Microceramus alegrensis Torre & Bartsch, 2008
 Microceramus anafensis Henderson, 1916
 Microceramus angulosus (Gundlach in Pfeiffer, 1857)
 Microceramus bermudezi Torre & Bartsch, 2008
 Microceramus bioscanus Torre & Bartsch, 2008
 Microceramus cabocruzensis Torre & Bartsch, 2008
 Microceramus camariocaensis Torre & Bartsch, 2008
 Microceramus camayensis Torre & Bartsch, 2008
 Microceramus caninus Torre & Bartsch, 2008
 Microceramus caninus Torre & Bartsch, 2008
 Microceramus carinatus Torre & Bartsch, 2008
 Microceramus catalinensis Torre & Bartsch, 2008
 Microceramus cienfuegoensis Torre & Bartsch, 2008
 Microceramus coliseoensis Torre & Bartsch, 2008
 Microceramus conicus Torre & Bartsch, 2008
 Microceramus costatus Torre & Bartsch, 2008
 Microceramus costellaris (Gundlach in Pfeiffer, 1863)
 Microceramus cubaensis Torre & Bartsch, 2008
 Microceramus delicatus Torre & Bartsch, 2008
 Microceramus denticulatus (Gundlach in Pfeiffer, 1863)
 Microceramus dulcis Torre & Bartsch, 2008
 Microceramus elegans (Gundlach in Pfeiffer, 1863)
 Microceramus euclatus Torre & Bartsch, 2008
 Microceramus florencianus Pilsbry, 1930
 Microceramus fogonensis Torre & Bartsch, 2008
 Microceramus gertrudis Torre & Bartsch, 2008
 Microceramus goseei (Pfeiffer, 1845)
 Microceramus havanensis Torre & Bartsch, 2008
 Microceramus hendersoni Torre & Bartsch, 2008
 Microceramus hicacoensis Torre & Bartsch, 2008
 Microceramus infradenticulatus (Wright in Pfeiffer, 1864)
 Microceramus islandicus Torre & Bartsch, 2008
 Microceramus latus (Gundlach in Pfeiffer, 1863)
 Microceramus laureanus Torre & Bartsch, 2008
 Microceramus leptus Torre & Bartsch, 2008
 Microceramus longus Henderson
 Microceramus maculatus (Gundlach in Pfeiffer, 1865)
 Microceramus marmoratus Torre & Bartsch, 2008
 Microceramus martinezi Torre & Bartsch, 2008
 Microceramus minor (Arango in Pfeiffer, 1866)
 Microceramus modestus Torre & Bartsch, 2008
 Microceramus mota Pilsbry, 1920
 Microceramus nigropictus (Gundlach in Pfeiffer, 1863)
 Microceramus orientalis Aguayo, 1935
 Microceramus paivanus (Pfeiffer, 1866)
 Microceramus palenquensis (Gundlach in Pfeiffer, 1863)
 Microceramus palmarensis Torre & Bartsch, 2008
 Microceramus perconicus Pilsbry, 1904
 Microceramus petitianus (d’Orbigny, 1841)
 Microceramus pilsbryi Torre & Bartsch, 2008
 Microceramus pipianensis Torre & Bartsch, 2008
 Microceramus portuondoi Torre & Bartsch, 2008
 Microceramus puntillaensis Torre & Bartsch, 2008
 Microceramus realensis Torre & Bartsch, 2008
 Microceramus remedioensis Torre & Bartsch, 2008
 Microceramus rufus Torre & Bartsch, 2008
 Microceramus sanctispiritensis Pilsbry, 1913
 Microceramus simplex (Pfeiffer, 1863)
 Microceramus sublatus Pilsbry & Torre, 1930
 Microceramus tantalus Torre & Bartsch, 2008
 Microceramus tenuistriatus Pilsbry, 1913
 Microceramus trinidadensis Torre & Bartsch, 2008
 Microceramus turricula (Pfeiffer, 1839)
 Microceramus virilus Torre & Bartsch, 2008
 Nesocoptis leoni Torre & Bartsch, 2008
 Nesocoptis majuscula Torre & Bartsch, 2008
 Nesocoptis mortei Torre & Bartsch, 2008
 Nesocoptis prima (Arango, 1882)
 Nesocoptis pruinosa (Morelet, 1849)
 Nodulia amoenivallis (Pilsbry, 1929)
 Nodulia caponensis Torre & Bartsch, 2008
 Nodulia corpulenta (Spence, 1936)
 Nodulia handi (Torre, 1927)
 Nodulia nodulifera (Torre, 1929)
 Nodulia oblita Torre & Bartsch, 2008
 Nodulia vignalensis (Wright in Pfeiffer, 1863)
 Organocoptis caiguanaboensis Torre & Bartsch, 2008
 Organocoptis catalinensis Torre & Bartsch, 2008
 Organocoptis constantia Torre & Bartsch, 2008
 Organocoptis fusiformis (Wright in Pfeiffer, 1863)
 Organocoptis galalonensis Torre & Bartsch, 2008
 Organocoptis integra (Pfeiffer, 1856)
 Organocoptis natensoni Torre & Bartsch, 2008
 Organocoptis portalesensis Torre & Bartsch, 2008
 Organocoptis remota (Arango, 1880)
 Organocoptis vigilantes Torre & Bartsch, 2008
 Paracallonia albocrenata (Gundlach in Pfeiffer, 1873)
 Pfeiffericoptis blanesi Torre & Bartsch, 2008
 Pfeiffericoptis cardenasensis Torre & Bartsch, 2008
 Pfeiffericoptis concreta (Gundlach in Pfeiffer,1863)
 Pfeiffericoptis cristallina (Wright in Pfeiffer, 1865)
 Pfeiffericoptis fumosa (Gundlach in Pfeiffer, 1863)
 Pfeiffericoptis garciana (Wright in Poey, 1864)
 Pfeiffericoptis insulana Torre & Bartsch, 2008
 Pfeiffericoptis lucens (Wright in Sowerby, 1875)
 Pfeiffericoptis machoi (Arango, 1876)
 Pfeiffericoptis moralesi (Gundlach in Arango, 1876)
 Pfeiffericoptis sagraiana (Pfeiffer, 1840)
 Pfeiffericoptis sinistra Torre & Bartsch, 2008
 Pfeiffericoptis wrightiana Torre & Bartsch, 2008
 Pineria beathiana Poey, 1854
 Pineria terebra Poey, 1854
 Planostemma intusfalcata (Torre & Ramsden, 1909)
 Planostemma laevigata (Gundlach in Pfeiffer, 1859)
 Planostemma miranda (Pilsbry, 1929)
 Planostemma pilotensis (Gundlach in Arango, 1862)
 Pleurostemma geminata (Gundlach in Pfeiffer, 1870)
 Pleurostemma intusmalleata (Gundlach in Pfeiffer, 1855)
 Pleurostemma perplicata (Beck, 1837)
 Poecilocoptis coerulans (Poey, 1864)
 Poecilocoptis crassilabris (Arango, 1882)
 Poecilocoptis diaphana (Wright in Arango, 1880)
 Poecilocoptis discors (Poey, 1856)
 Poecilocoptis incerta (Arango, 1881)
 Poecilocoptis lagunillensis (Pilsbry, 1903)
 Poecilocoptis macra (Wright in Pfeiffer, 1867)
 Poecilocoptis nubila (Poey, 1864)
 Poeycoptis auberiana (d’Orbigny, 1842)
 Poeycoptis caeciliae (Gundlach in Arango, 1876)
 Poeycoptis lituus (Gould, 1842)
 Poeycoptis sosai Torre & Bartsch, 2008
 Pycnoptychia amicorum Torre & Bartsch, 2008
 Pycnoptychia humboldtiana (Pfeiffer, 1840)
 Pycnoptychia oviedoiana (d’Orbigny, 1842)
 Pycnoptychia peraffinis (Pilsbry, 1903)
 Pycnoptychia scaeva (Gundlach in Pfeiffer, 1863)
 Pycnoptychia shuttleworthiana (Poey, 1856)
 Pycnoptychia strangulata (Poey, 1856)
 Pycnoptychia striatella (Wright in Pfeiffer, 1864)
 Pycnoptychia torrei (Arango, 1876)
 Pycnoptychia trina Torre & Bartsch, 2008
 Sagracoptis consanguinea (Arango, 1882)
 Sagracoptis coronadoi (Arango in Pfeiffer, 1864)
 Sagracoptis crispula (Pfeiffer, 1839)
 Sagracoptis difficultosa (Arango, 1882)
 Sagracoptis distincta (Gundlach in Arango, 1876)
 Sagracoptis robusta Torre & Bartsch, 2008
 Sagracoptis scholappi Torre & Bartsch, 2008
 Septilumem ornata (Gundlach in Pfeiffer, 1859)
 Spiroceramus amplus (Pfeiffer, 1858)
 Spiroceramus barbouri Aguayo, 1958
 Spiroceramus castanedoi Torre & Bartsch, 2008
 Spiroceramus pilsbryi Clench
 Spiroceramus vanattai Clench
 Steatocoptis abnormis (Gundlach in Pilsbry, 1903)
 Steatocoptis bioscai Torre & Bartsch, 2008
 Steatocoptis ventricosa (Gundlach in Pfeiffer, 1857)
 Teneria teneriensis (Wright in Pfeiffer, 1865)
 Teniustemma multispiralis (Sowerby, 1875)
 Tenuistemma lateralis (Paz in Pfeiffer, 1860)
 Tetrentodon acus Torre & Bartsch, 2008
 Tetrentodon aguayoi Torre & Bartsch, 2008
 Tetrentodon alleni Torre & Bartsch, 2008
 Tetrentodon antonitensis Torre & Bartsch, 2008
 Tetrentodon barroi Torre & Bartsch, 2008
 Tetrentodon bijaensis Torre & Bartsch, 2008
 Tetrentodon bonillensis Torre & Bartsch, 2008
 Tetrentodon brevicollis Pfeiffer in Pilsbry, 1903
 Tetrentodon camaronensis Torre & Bartsch, 2008
 Tetrentodon camoensis (Pfeiffer, 1855)
 Tetrentodon canasiensis Torre & Bartsch, 2008
 Tetrentodon canimarensis Torre & Bartsch, 2008
 Tetrentodon caobaensis Torre & Bartsch, 2008
 Tetrentodon ceciliasensis Torre & Bartsch, 2008
 Tetrentodon ceiba Torre & Bartsch, 2008
 Tetrentodon ceibamochensis Torre & Bartsch, 2008
 Tetrentodon claritaensis Torre & Bartsch, 2008
 Tetrentodon clenchi (Aguayo, 1932)
 Tetrentodon clerchi (Arango in Pfeiffer, 1870)
 Tetrentodon cocaensis Torre & Bartsch, 2008
 Tetrentodon coliseoensis Torre & Bartsch, 2008
 Tetrentodon cyclostoma (Pfeiffer, 1855)
 Tetrentodon distorta Torre & Bartsch, 2008
 Tetrentodon elizaldensis Torre & Bartsch, 2008
 Tetrentodon emili Torre & Bartsch, 2008
 Tetrentodon empalmensis Torre & Bartsch, 2008
 Tetrentodon filiola Torre & Bartsch, 2008
 Tetrentodon gracillima (Poey, 1853)
 Tetrentodon gravidula Torre & Bartsch, 2008
 Tetrentodon grillensis Torre & Bartsch, 2008
 Tetrentodon guanaboensis Torre & Bartsch, 2008
 Tetrentodon gundlachiana (Poey, 1856)
 Tetrentodon hesperia Torre & Bartsch, 2008
 Tetrentodon insuflata Torre & Bartsch, 2008
 Tetrentodon ischna (Pilsbry, 1903)
 Tetrentodon itineraris Torre & Bartsch, 2008
 Tetrentodon jarucoensis Torre & Bartsch, 2008
 Tetrentodon lajasensis Torre & Bartsch, 2008
 Tetrentodon lermondi Torre & Bartsch, 2008
 Tetrentodon limonarensis Torre & Bartsch, 2008
 Tetrentodon madrugaensis Torre & Bartsch, 2008
 Tetrentodon marmorata (Shuttleworth, 1852)
 Tetrentodon martii Torre & Bartsch, 2008
 Tetrentodon mellita (Torre, 1932)
 Tetrentodon mendezi Torre & Bartsch, 2008
 Tetrentodon miraderoensis Torre & Bartsch, 2008
 Tetrentodon mochensis Torre & Bartsch, 2008
 Tetrentodon modesta (Poey, 1858)
 Tetrentodon montanensis Torre & Bartsch, 2008
 Tetrentodon montecristensis Torre & Bartsch, 2008
 Tetrentodon mudoensis Torre & Bartsch, 2008
 Tetrentodon nana Torre & Bartsch, 2008
 Tetrentodon nazarenensis Torre & Bartsch, 2008
 Tetrentodon palenquensis Torre & Bartsch, 2008
 Tetrentodon palmeri Torre & Bartsch, 2008
 Tetrentodon paucicostata Torre & Bartsch, 2008
 Tetrentodon perdidoensis Torre & Bartsch, 2008
 Tetrentodon perdita Torre & Bartsch, 2008
 Tetrentodon perlonga (Torre, 1932)
 Tetrentodon philippiana (Pfeiffer, 1845)
 Tetrentodon pipianensis Torre & Bartsch, 2008
 Tetrentodon plicata (Poey, 1856)
 Tetrentodon poeyi Torre & Bartsch, 2008
 Tetrentodon porrecta Torre & Bartsch, 2008
 Tetrentodon portuondoi Torre, 1932
 Tetrentodon ritae Torre & Bartsch, 2008
 Tetrentodon ritana Torre & Bartsch, 2008
 Tetrentodon rugeli (Shuttleworht, 1852)
 Tetrentodon santacruzensis Torre & Bartsch, 2008
 Tetrentodon sardae Torre & Bartsch, 2008
 Tetrentodon scalarina Torre & Bartsch, 2008
 Tetrentodon sexdecimalis Jimeno in Pfeiffer, 1863
 Tetrentodon sparsicostata Torre & Bartsch, 2008
 Tetrentodon striosa Torre & Bartsch, 2008
 Tetrentodon tenuicostata Torre & Bartsch, 2008
 Tetrentodon tenuistriata (Aguayo, 1932)
 Tetrentodon vesperalis Torre & Bartsch, 2008
 Tetrentodon viruelaensis Torre & Bartsch, 2008
 Tomelasmus adnatus (Pfeiffer, 1864)
 Tomelasmus arcustriatus (Wright in Pfeiffer, 1863)
 Tomelasmus assimilis (Arango, 1884)
 Tomelasmus azucarensis Torre & Bartsch, 2008
 Tomelasmus caroli Torre & Bartsch, 2008
 Tomelasmus chorrerensis Torre & Bartsch, 2008
 Tomelasmus coloratus (Arango, 1882)
 Tomelasmus crenulatus (Gundlach, 1857)
 Tomelasmus decoloratus (Gundlach in Pfeiffer, 1863)
 Tomelasmus denticulatus (Pfeiffer, 1853)
 Tomelasmus hesperius Jaume & Torre, 1972
 Tomelasmus irroratus (Gundlach, 1856)
 Tomelasmus julii Jaume & Torre, 1972
 Tomelasmus lavalleanus (d’Orbigny, 1842)
 Tomelasmus sauvalleanus (Gundlach, 1856)
 Tomelasmus semicoloratus (Spence, 1936)
 Tomelasmus thomsoni (Arango, 1884)
 Tomelasmus torquatus (Morelet, 1849)
 Tomelasmus tumidiorus (Sowerby, 1875)
 Torrecoptis acicularis (Torre, 1912)
 Torrecoptis amica Torre & Bartsch, 2008
 Torrecoptis anafensis (Henderson, 1916)
 Torrecoptis atkinsi (Torre & Clench, 1930)
 Torrecoptis bacillaris (Torre, 1912)
 Torrecoptis baculum (Pilsbry, 1903)
 Torrecoptis barbouri (Clench & Torre, 1930)
 Torrecoptis barretticola Torre & Bartsch, 2008
 Torrecoptis camagueyana (Torre, 1913)
 Torrecoptis capitoliensis Torre & Bartsch, 2008
 Torrecoptis caracunaensis Torre & Bartsch, 2008
 Torrecoptis cinerea (Pfeiffer, 1850)
 Torrecoptis columbarii Torre & Bartsch, 2008
 Torrecoptis concinna Torre & Bartsch, 2008
 Torrecoptis costellaris Torre & Bartsch, 2008
 Torrecoptis curta Torre & Bartsch, 2008
 Torrecoptis decipiens Torre & Bartsch, 2008
 Torrecoptis depressicostata Torre & Bartsch, 2008
 Torrecoptis dorotheae Torre & Bartsch, 2008
 Torrecoptis eustriata Torre & Bartsch, 2008
 Torrecoptis evanescens Torre & Bartsch, 2008
 Torrecoptis fortiuscula (Torre, 1912)
 Torrecoptis fuscula Torre & Bartsch, 2008
 Torrecoptis goodrichi Torre & Bartsch, 2008
 Torrecoptis guajenensis Torre & Bartsch, 2008
 Torrecoptis holguinensis (Aguayo, 1934)
 Torrecoptis lajoncheri (Arango, 1884)
 Torrecoptis livida (Torre, 1912)
 Torrecoptis longa (Pilsbry & Henderson, 1913)
 Torrecoptis mameyensis Torre & Bartsch, 2008
 Torrecoptis maraguanensis Torre & Bartsch, 2008
 Torrecoptis martinensis Torre & Bartsch, 2008
 Torrecoptis mercedesensis (Pilsbry, 1930)
 Torrecoptis minaensis Torre & Bartsch, 2008
 Torrecoptis nataliae Torre & Bartsch, 2008
 Torrecoptis occulta (Torre, 1912)
 Torrecoptis oleacea Torre & Bartsch, 2008
 Torrecoptis pallidula (Torre, 1912)
 Torrecoptis parvula Torre & Bartsch, 2008
 Torrecoptis paucicostata Torre & Bartsch, 2008
 Torrecoptis percostata Torre & Bartsch, 2008
 Torrecoptis polita Torre & Bartsch, 2008
 Torrecoptis praeclara Torre & Bartsch, 2008
 Torrecoptis puriosensis Torre & Bartsch, 2008
 Torrecoptis recticostata Torre & Bartsch, 2008
 Torrecoptis remoticostata Torre & Bartsch, 2008
 Torrecoptis rinconensis Torre & Bartsch, 2008
 Torrecoptis riveroni Torre & Bartsch, 2008
 Torrecoptis rufescens Torre & Bartsch, 2008
 Torrecoptis semistriata Torre & Bartsch, 2008
 Torrecoptis serrana Torre & Bartsch, 2008
 Torrecoptis sifontesi Torre & Bartsch, 2008
 Torrecoptis sororcula Torre & Bartsch, 2008
 Torrecoptis spatiata Torre & Bartsch, 2008
 Torrecoptis spirifer (Pilsbry, 1930)
 Torrecoptis stricta (Torre, 1912)
 Torrecoptis teniusculpta Torre & Bartsch, 2008
 Torrecoptis trincherasensis Torre & Bartsch, 2008
 Torrecoptis unctuella Torre & Bartsch, 2008
 Torrecoptis vermicularis Torre & Bartsch, 2008
 Torrecoptis vitulina Torre & Bartsch, 2008
 Torrecoptis welchi Torre & Bartsch, 2008
 Torrecoptis yaguajayensis Torre & Bartsch, 2008
 Torrecoptis zanjonensis Torre & Bartsch, 2008
 Trilamellaxis castanea (Torre, 1911)
 Trilamellaxis fallax (Torre, 1911)
 Trilamellaxis parallela Torre & Bartsch, 2008
 Trilamellaxis proteus (Torre, 1911)
 Trilamellaxis remediensis (Torre, 1911)
 Trilamellaxis transitoria (Torre, 1911)
 Uncinicoptis affinis (Pffeifer, 1864)
 Uncinicoptis brevicervix (Pilsbry, 1878)
 Uncinicoptis heynemanni (Pfeiffer, 1865)
 Uncinicoptis hidalgoi (Arango, 1879)
 Uncinicoptis joaquini (Pilsbry, 1903)
 Uncinicoptis sancticola Torre & Bartsch, 2008
 Uncinicoptis tenericola Torre & Bartsch, 2008
 Uncinicoptis unguiculata (Arango, 1880)

Ferussaciidae
 Cecilioides aperta (Guilding in Swainson, 1840)
 Cecilioides consobrina (d’Orbigny, 1842)
 Cecilioides iota (C. B. Adams, 1845)

Subulinidae
 Beckianum beckianum (Pfeiffer, 1846)

 Cryptelasmus alcaldei Jaume & Sánchez de Fuentes, 1943
 Cryptelasmus canteroiana (Gundlach in Pfeiffer, 1857)
 Cryptelasmus verai Jaume & Sánchez de Fuentes, 1943
 Cupulella dominguezi Aguayo & Jaume, 1948
 Cupulella vallei Aguayo & Jaume, 1948
 Lamellaxis gracilis (Hutton, 1834)
 Lamellaxis micra (d’Orbigny, 1835)
 Leptinaria paludinoides (d’Orbigny, 1842)
 Leptinaria striosa abdita (Poey, 1858)
 Leptinaria unilamellata (d’Orbigny, 1835)
 Obeliscus acicularis Aguayo & Jaume, 1957
 Obeliscus angustatus (Gundlach, 1856)
 Obeliscus bacillus (Pfeiffer, 1861)
 Obeliscus basilissa Aguayo & Jaume, 1954
 Obeliscus binneyi Pilsbry, 1906
 Obeliscus blandianus Pilsbry, 1906
 Obeliscus clavus flavus Pilsbry, 1906
 Obeliscus gonostoma (Gundlach in Pfeiffer, 1863)
 Obeliscus gundlachi (Pfeiffer, 1863)
 Obeliscus homalogyrus (Shuttleworth in Pfeiffer, 1851)
 Obeliscus lata Gundlach in Pilsbry, 1905
 Obeliscus maximus (Poey, 1854)
 Obeliscus microstoma (Gundlach in Pfeiffer, 1863)
 Obeliscus paradoxus (Arango, 1881)
 Obeliscus petricola Aguayo & Jaume, 1957
 Obeliscus saugeti Aguayo & Jaume, 1957
 Obeliscus strictus (Poey, 1853)
 Obeliscus swiftianus (Pfeiffer, 1852)
 Obeliscus terebraster (Lamarck, 1822)
 Opeas pumilum (Pfeiffer, 1840)
 Rumina decollata (Linné, 1758)
 Subulina octona (Bruguiére, 1792)

Oleacinidae
 Glandinella poeyana (Pfeiffer, 1854)
 Melaniella acuticostata (d’Orbigny, 1842)
 Melaniella alcaldei Aguayo & Jaume, 1954
 Melaniella bermudezi Aguayo & Jaume, 1954
 Melaniella camagueyana Aguayo & Jaume, 1954
 Melaniella fuentesi Aguayo & Jaume, 1954
 Melaniella gracillima (Pfeiffer, 1839)
 Melaniella manzanillensis (Gundlach in Pfeiffer, 1857)
 Melaniella multicosta (Gundlach in Pfeiffer, 1866)
 Melaniella pichardi (Arango, 1862)
 Melaniella quiñonesi Aguayo & Jaume, 1954
 Melaniella scalarina (Gundlach in Pfeiffer, 1866)
 Melaniella tuberculata Gundlach in Poey, 1858
 Oleacina cyanozoaria Gundlach in Pfeiffer, 1857
 Oleacina incerta (Reeve in Pfeiffer, 1866)
 Oleacina incisa Pfeiffer, 1867
 Oleacina lindoni (Pfeiffer, 1846)
 Oleacina orysacea (Rang in d’Orbigny, 1842)
 Oleacina ottonis (Pfeiffer)
 Oleacina poeyana Pfeiffer, 1866
 Oleacina rangelina Aguayo, 1953
 Oleacina regularis (Gundlach in Pfeiffer, 1857)
 Oleacina saturata (Gundlach in Pfeiffer, 1857)
 Oleacina sicilis Morelet, 1849
 Oleacina solidula (Pfeiffer, 1840)
 Oleacina straminea (Deshayes, 1819)
 Oleacina subulata (Pfeiffer, 1839)
 Oleacina teres Pfeiffer, 1866
 Oleacina translucida Gundlach in Pfeiffer, 1860
 Oleacina wrighti Pfeiffer, 1866
 Rectoleacina cubensis (d’Orbigny, 1842)
 Rectoleacina episcopalis (Morelet)
 Rectoleacina suturalis (Pfeiffer, 1839)
 Varicella elata (Gundlach in Pfeiffer, 1857)
 Varicella gundlachi (Pfeiffer, 1866)
 Varicella multilineata Pilsbry, 1907
 Varicella swiftiana Pilsbry, 1907
 Varicella trinitaria (Gundlach in Poey, 1858)

Spiraxidae
 Pseudosubulina exilis (Pfeiffer, 1839)
 Pseudosubulina iridescens Ramsden & Torre, ms.
 Pseudosubulina michaudiana (d’Orbigny, 1842)
 Spiraxis moreletianus Pfeiffer, 1866
 Volutaxis melanielloides Gundlach in Pfeiffer, 1858

Streptaxidae
 Rhabdogulella bicolor (Hutton, 1834)
 Streptostele musaecola (Morelet, 1860)

Haplotrematidae
 Haplotrema paucispira (Poey, 1858)

Helicodiscidae
 Helicodiscus apex (C. B. Adams, 1849)
 Helicodiscus ramsdeni Pilsbry, 1942

Sagdidae
 Euclastaria debilis (Pfeiffer, 1839)
 Euclastaria euclasta (Shuttleworth, 1852)
 Hojeda boothiana (Pfeiffer, 1839)
 Hojeda gracilis (Poey, 1865)
 Hojeda holguinensis Clench & Aguayo, 1953
 Hojeda mayarina Aguayo, 1953
 Hojeda montetaurina (Pfeiffer, 1859)
 Hojeda translucens (Gundlach in Pfeiffer, 1860)
 Lacteoluna prominula (Pfeiffer, 1858)
 Lacteoluna selenina (Gould, 1839)
 Lacteoluna turbiniformis (Pfeiffer, 1839)
 Odontosagda havanensis Vanatta, 1920
 Odontosagda hillei (Gundlach in Pfeiffer, 1870)
 Setipellis stigmatica (Pfeiffer, 1841)
 Suavitas raripila (Morelet, 1851)
 Suavitas suavis (Gundlach, 1857)
 Volvidens tichostoma (Pfeiffer, 1839)

Gastrodontidae
 Zonitoides arboreus (Say, 1862)
 Zonitoides bregyl Vanatta, 1920

Euconulidae
 Euconulus fulvus (Müller, 1774)
 Guppya gundlachi (Pfeiffer, 1840)

Zonitidae
 Retinella identata paucilirata (Morelet, 1864)

Agriolimacidae
 Deroceras laeve (Müller, 1774)
 Deroceras agreste (Linné, 1758)
 Deroceras retitulatum (Müller, 1774)

Vitrinidae
 Hawaiia minuscula (Binney, 1840)

Bradybaenidae
 Bradybaena similaris (Férussac, 1821)

Camaenidae
 Caracolus lowei Pilsbry, 1929
 Caracolus najazensis Clench & Aguayo, 1951
 Caracolus sagemon (Beck, 1837)
 Polydontes apollo (Pfeiffer, 1860)
 Polydontes imperator (Montfort, 1810)
 Polydontes natensoni Torre, 1938
 Polydontes sobrina (Férussac, 1819)
 Polydontes torrei Pilsbry, 1938
 Zachrysia auricoma (Férussac, 1822)
 Zachrysia baracoensis (Gutierrez in Pfeiffer, 1856)
 Zachrysia bayamensis (Pfeiffer, 1854)
 Zachrysia emarginata (Gundlach in Pfeiffer, 1859)
 Zachrysia flavicoma Pilsbry, 1928
 Zachrysia gibarana Pilsbry, 1928
 Zachrysia guanensis (Poey, 1857)
 Zachrysia guantanamensis (Poey, 1857)
 Zachrysia gundlachiana Pilsbry, 1928
 Zachrysia lamellicosta (Gundlach in Pfeiffer, 1861)
 Zachrysia noscibilis (Férussac, 1822)
 Zachrysia petitiana (d’Orbigny, 1842)
 Zachrysia poeyi Jaume, 1984
 Zachrysia proboscidea (Pfeiffer, 1856)
 Zachrysia provisoria (Pfeiffer, 1858)
 Zachrysia ramsdeni Pilsbry, 1928
 Zachrysia rangelina (Pfeiffer, 1854)
 Zachrysia torrei (Henderson, 1916)
 Zachrysia trinitaria (Gundlach in Pfeiffer, 1858)

Cepolidae
 Coryda alauda (Férussac, 1821)
 Coryda armasi Sarasúa, 1972
 Coryda bartlettiana (Pfeiffer, 1848)
 Coryda lindoni (Pfeiffer, 1846)
 Coryda melanocephala (Gundlach in Pfeiffer, 1859)
 Coryda nigropicta (Arango in Poey, 1867)
 Coryda ovumreguli (Lea)
 Cysticopsis auberi (d’Orbigny, 1842)
 Cysticopsis comes (Poey, 1858)
 Cysticopsis cubensis (Pfeiffer, 1840)
 Cysticopsis exauberi Aguayo & Jaume, 1954
 Cysticopsis jaudenesi (Cisneros in Arango, 1876)
 Cysticopsis lassevillei (Gundlach in Pfeiffer, 1861)
 Cysticopsis lescallei (Gundlach in Pfeiffer, 1859)
 Cysticopsis letranensis (Pfeiffer, 1857)
 Cysticopsis luzi (Arango in Poey, 1868)
 Cysticopsis naevula (Morelet)
 Cysticopsis pemphigodes (Pfeiffer, 1846)
 Eurycampta arctistria (Pfeiffer, 1865)
 Eurycampta bonplandi (Lamarck, 1822)
 Eurycampta exdeflexa (Pilsbry, 1890)
 Eurycampta pinarensis (Aguayo, 1950)
 Eurycampta poeyi (Petit, 1836)
 Eurycampta supertexta (Pfeiffer, 1845)
 Hemitrochus alleni Aguayo & Jaume, 1957
 Hemitrochus amplecta (Gundlach in Pfeiffer, 1860)
 Hemitrochus beattiei Aguayo & Jaume, 1957
 Hemitrochus cesticulus (Gundlach in Pfeiffer, 1858)
 Hemitrochus compta (Gundlach in Pfeiffer, 1857)
 Hemitrochus fuscolabiata (Poey, 1858)
 Hemitrochus garciana Clench & Aguayo, 1953
 Hemitrochus hendersoni Aguayo & Jaume, 1957
 Hemitrochus lucipeta (Poey, 1854)
 Hemitrochus maculifera (Gutiérrez in Poey, 1858)
 Hemitrochus maisiana Aguayo & Jaume, 1957
 Hemitrochus morbida (Morelet)
 Hemitrochus pseudogilva Torre
 Hemitrochus rufoapicata (Poey, 1858)
 Hemitrochus sauvallei (Arango in Pfeiffer, 1866)
 Hemitrochus tephritis (Morelet)
 Hemitrochus varians (Menke, 1829)
 Hemitrochus velazqueziana (Poey, 1858)
 Jeanneretia bicincta (Menke, 1830)
 Jeanneretia gundlachi Clench & Aguayo, 1951
 Jeanneretia jaumei Clench & Aguayo, 1951
 Jeanneretia modica Clench & Aguayo, 1951
 Jeanneretia parraiana (d’Orbigny, 1842)
 Jeanneretia sagraiana (d’Orbigny, 1842)
 Jeanneretia subtussulcata (Wright in Pfeiffer, 1863)
 Jeanneretia torrei Clench & Aguayo, 1933
 Jeanneretia wrighti (Gundlach in Pfeiffer, 1865)
 Plagiotycha gregoriana Dall, 1905

Polygyridae
 Daedalochila poeyi Aguayo & Jaume, 1947
 Polygyra lingulata (Deshayes in Férussac, 1859)
 Praticolella griseola (Pfeiffer, 1841)

Thysanophoridae
 Thysanophora incrustata (Poey, 1852)
 Thysanophora jeannereti (Pfeiffer, 1858)
 Thysanophora saxicola (Pfeiffer, 1840)
 Thysanophora plagioptycha (Shuttleworth, 1854)

Cepolidae or Helminthoglyptidae or Xanthonychidae or 
 genus Polymita Beck, 1837 is endemic to Cuba

Bivalvia

Unionidae
 Nephronaias gundlachi (Dunker, 1858) – endemic to Pinar del Río, scarce distribution
 Nephronaias scammata (Morelet, 1849) – endemic to Pinar del Río, scarce distribution

Corbiculidae
 Corbicula fluminea (O. F. Müller, 1774) – introduced.

See also
 List of marine molluscs of Cuba

Lists of molluscs of surrounding countries:
 List of non-marine molluscs of the United States
 List of non-marine molluscs of the Bahamas
 List of non-marine molluscs of Haiti
 List of non-marine molluscs of Jamaica
 List of non-marine molluscs of the Cayman Islands
 List of non-marine molluscs of Mexico

References
This article incorporates CC-BY-3.0 text from the reference

Further reading  
 Hance J. (28 June 2010). "Long-ignored freshwater molluscs in Cuba under threat". mongabay.com
  Espinosa J. & Ortea J. (1999). "Moluscos terrestres del archipiélago cubano". Avicennia 2: 1–137.
 Espinosa J. & Ortea J. (2009). "Moluscos terrestres de Cuba". Vaasa. Finlandia, 191 pp.

 Fernández A., Pellicier K., Ríos D. & Salazar R. (2010). "Registros nuevos de moluscos terrestres para el Sector La Melba del Parque Nacional "Alejandro de Humboldt", Cuba". Cocuyo 18: 35–37. PDF.
  Guillén A. G. (2008). Cuba the landshells paradise. 308 pp.
 Kabat A. R., Herschler R. & González G. A. (2012). "Resolution of taxonomic problems associated with the complex publication history of the seminal Torre and Bartsch monograph on Cuban Urocoptidae (Gastropoda, Pulmonata)". Zootaxa 3362: 43–53. PDF.
  Mesa García R & Jaume García ML. (1979). [Quantitative Synopsis of the Cuban ground mollusc fauna]. Rev. Cubana Med. Trop. 31(1): 73–82. 
 Pointier J. P., Yong M. & Gutiérrez A. (2005). Guide to the Freshwater Molluscs of Cuba. ConchBooks, Hackenheim, Germany.

 Non marine moll
Molluscs
Cuba
Cuba
Cuba